The Passage Island Light Station is a lighthouse located  NE of Isle Royale, in NW Lake Superior, Michigan on Passage Island. It was listed on the National Register of Historic Places in 2006.

Description 

It is topped with a ten-sided cast iron lantern, accessible via a spiral staircase within the tower.

History 
The need for a lighthouse between Passage Island and Isle Royale was recognized as early as the 1860s, as lake traffic increased dramatically due to the upsurge in mining in the Upper Peninsula.  However, it took until 1875 before Congress authorized funds for the construction of a lighthouse.  However, because of Congress's desire to bring political pressure to bear on the Canadian government to force them to build a lighthouse in Lake Erie, the appropriated $18,000 for Pasage Light was not released until 1880.  Construction began in 1881, and the light was completed the following year.  A fog signal was added in 1884, and in 1894 a new flashing white lens manufactured by Barbier, Benard & Turenne of Paris was installed.

In 1978, the station was automated, and in 1989 a  acrylic lens was installed, replacing the Fresnel.

Further reading
Passage Island Light Station, Survey number HABS MI-385, Historic American Buildings Survey
Passage Island Light Station, Lighthouse, Survey number HABS MI-385-A, Historic American Buildings Survey
Passage Island Light Station, Fog Signal Building, Survey number HABS MI-385-B, Historic American Buildings Survey
Passage Island Light Station, Oil Storage Building, Survey number HABS MI-385-C, Historic American Buildings Survey
Passage Island Light Station, Privy Building, Survey number HABS MI-385-D, Historic American Buildings Survey
Passage Island Light Station, Tramway Equipment Building, Survey number HABS MI-385-E, Historic American Buildings Survey
Passage Island Light Station, Pump House, Survey number HABS MI-385-F, Historic American Buildings Survey

References

External links

Lighthouses completed in 1882
Houses completed in 1882
Lighthouses in Keweenaw County, Michigan
Lighthouses on the National Register of Historic Places in Michigan
Gothic Revival architecture in Michigan
National Register of Historic Places in Isle Royale National Park
1882 establishments in Michigan